is a Japanese manga series written and illustrated by Tsuya Tsuya. It has been serialized in Akita Shoten's seinen manga magazine Bessatsu Young Champion since November 2014.

Publication
Akita Shoten has collected its chapters into individual tankōbon volumes. The first volume was released on August 20, 2015. As of March 17, 2022, twelve volumes have been released.

Its first volume was released on June 19, 2020. As of November 18, 2021, two volumes have been released.

Volume list

Rakujitsu no Pathos

Tasogare no Ethos

See also
Mikazuki ga Waratteru, another manga series by the same author
Futari no Ouchi, another manga series by the same author
Shiori's Diary, another manga series by the same author

References

Further reading
</ref>

External links
 

Akita Shoten manga
Romance anime and manga
Seinen manga